Philiris hypoxantha is a species of butterfly of the family Lycaenidae. It is found in West Irian (Snow Mountains, Mount Goliath).

References

Butterflies described in 1926
Luciini